Jean-Marie Rausch (born 24 September 1929 in Sarreguemines) is a French politician who served as the French Minister of Foreign Trade from 1988 to 1991. He became a Knight of the Legion of Honour in 2002.

References

Living people
1929 births
French politicians